"Stuck in My Throat" is the fourth single by Surrey-based rock band Reuben, and the first to be taken from the album Racecar Is Racecar Backwards. It was recorded at Stakeout Studios in Chobham where the band recorded the album with producer Jason Wilson. It was released in October 2003 on the Integrity Records and Xtra Mile labels (cat. no. INT 023), home to Million Dead, on CD and 7" vinyl, a first for the band. It received positive reviews and reached #76 in the UK chart. Zane Lowe made it his Radio 1 single of the week, but XFM said that it was 'too heavy' to play.

Track listings

CD and 7"
"Stuck in My Throat"
"Doll Fin"
"Scared of the Police" (Live for XFM)

Personnel
Jamie Lenman - Guitars, vocals, piano
Jon Pearce - Bass, vocals
Guy Davis - Drums

Reuben (band) songs
2003 singles
2003 songs
Xtra Mile Recordings singles
Songs written by Jamie Lenman